Filip Mingotti (born December 18, 1993) is a Swedish ice hockey player. He is currently playing with Karlskrona HK of the Swedish Hockey League (SHL).

Mingotti made his Swedish Hockey League debut playing with Karlskrona HK during the 2012-13 SHL season.

References

External links

1993 births
Living people
Karlskrona HK players
Swedish ice hockey defencemen